The term micro-g environment (also μg, often referred to by the term microgravity) is more or less synonymous with the terms weightlessness and zero-g, but emphasising that g-forces are never exactly zero—just very small (on the International Space Station (ISS), for example, the small g-forces come from tidal effects, gravity from objects other than the Earth, such as astronauts, the spacecraft, and the Sun, air resistance, and astronaut movements that impart momentum to the space station). The symbol for microgravity, μg, was used on the insignias of Space Shuttle flights STS-87 and STS-107, because these flights were devoted to microgravity research in low Earth orbit.

The most commonly known microgravity environment can be found aboard the ISS which is located in low-earth orbit at an altitude of around 400 km, orbiting Earth approximately 15 times per day in what is considered free fall.

The effects of free fall also enable the creation of short-duration microgravity environments on Earth. This is accomplished by using droptube, parabolic flights and Random-positioning machines (RPMs).

Absence of gravity
A "stationary" micro-g environment would require travelling far enough into deep space so as to reduce the effect of gravity by attenuation to almost zero. This is simple in conception but requires travelling a very large distance, rendering it highly impractical. For example, to reduce the gravity of the Earth by a factor of one million, one needs to be at a distance of 6 million kilometres from the Earth, but to reduce the gravity of the Sun to this amount, one has to be at a distance of 3.7 billion kilometres. This is not impossible, but it has only been achieved thus far by four interstellar probes: (Voyager 1 and 2 of the Voyager program, and Pioneer 10 and 11 of the Pioneer program.) At the speed of light it would take roughly three and a half hours to reach this micro-gravity environment (a region of space where the acceleration due to gravity is one-millionth of that experienced on the Earth's surface). To reduce the gravity to one-thousandth of that on Earth's surface, however, one needs only to be at a distance of 200,000 km.

At a distance relatively close to Earth (less than 3000 km), gravity is only slightly reduced. As an object orbits a body such as the Earth, gravity is still attracting objects towards the Earth and the object is accelerated downward at almost 1g. Because the objects are typically moving laterally with respect to the surface at such immense speeds, the object will not lose altitude because of the curvature of the Earth. When viewed from an orbiting observer, other close objects in space appear to be floating because everything is being pulled towards Earth at the same speed, but also moving forward as the Earth's surface "falls" away below. All these objects are in free fall, not zero gravity.

Compare the gravitational potential at some of these locations.

Free fall

Free fall occurs when an object is in a gravitational field with no other forces acting on it. Although the force of gravity extends throughout all space, it is possible to experience "zero gravity" in free fall. That is, an object in free fall will accelerate. In the frame of reference or coordinate system moving with the object the gravitational force would be zero. This doesn't mean that the force has somehow been "turned off" or that gravity disappears, only that when viewed in the accelerated reference frame the force is zero. From the perspective of an observer not moving with the object (i.e. in an inertial reference frame) the force of gravity is exactly the same as usual.

A classic example is an elevator car where the cable has been cut and it plummets toward Earth, accelerating at a rate equal to the 9.8 meters per second per second. In this scenario, the gravitational force is mostly, but not entirely, diminished; anyone in the elevator would experience an absence of the usual gravitational pull, however the force is not exactly zero. Since gravity is a force directed towards the center of the Earth, two balls a horizontal distance apart would be pulled in slightly different directions and would come closer together as the elevator dropped. Also, if they were some vertical distance apart the lower one would experience a higher gravitational force than the upper one since gravity diminishes according to the inverse square law. These two second-order effects are examples of micro gravity.

Orbits
Orbital motion is a form of free fall. Objects in orbit are not perfectly weightless due to several effects:
Effects depending on relative position in the spacecraft:
Because the force of gravity decreases with distance, objects with non-zero size will be subjected to a tidal force, or a differential pull, between the ends of the object nearest and furthest from the Earth. (An extreme version of this effect is spaghettification.) In a spacecraft in low Earth orbit (LEO), the centrifugal force is also greater on the side of the spacecraft furthest from the Earth. At a 400 km LEO altitude, the overall differential in g-force is approximately 0.384 μg/m.
Gravity between the spacecraft and an object within it may make the object slowly "fall" toward a more massive part of it. The acceleration is 0.007 μg for 1000 kg at 1 m distance.
Uniform effects (which could be compensated):
Though extremely thin, there is some air at orbital altitudes of 185 to 1,000 km. This atmosphere causes minuscule deceleration due to friction. This could be compensated by a small continuous thrust, but in practice the deceleration is only compensated from time to time, so the tiny g-force of this effect is not eliminated.
The effects of the solar wind and radiation pressure are similar, but directed away from the Sun. Unlike the effect of the atmosphere, it does not reduce with altitude.
Other Effects:
Routine crew activity: Due to the conservation of momentum, any crew member aboard a spacecraft pushing off a wall causes the spacecraft to move in the opposite direction.
Structural Vibration: Stress enacted on the hull of the spacecraft results in the spacecraft bending, causing apparent acceleration.

Commercial applications

Metal spheres

High-quality crystals
While not yet a commercial application, there has been interest in growing crystals in micro-g, as in a space station or automated artificial satellite, in an attempt to reduce crystal lattice defects. Such defect-free crystals may prove useful for certain microelectronic applications and also to produce crystals for subsequent X-ray crystallography.

Health effects of the micro-g environment

Space motion sickness

Space motion sickness (SMS) is thought to be a subtype of motion sickness that plagues nearly half of all astronauts who venture into space. SMS, along with facial stuffiness from headward shifts of fluids, headaches, and back pain, is part of a broader complex of symptoms that comprise space adaptation syndrome (SAS). SMS was first described in 1961 during the second orbit of the fourth manned spaceflight when the cosmonaut Gherman Titov aboard the Vostok 2, described feeling disoriented with physical complaints mostly consistent with motion sickness. It is one of the most studied physiological problems of spaceflight but continues to pose a significant difficulty for many astronauts. In some instances, it can be so debilitating that astronauts must sit out from their scheduled occupational duties in space – including missing out on a spacewalk they have spent months training to perform. In most cases, however, astronauts will work through the symptoms even with degradation in their performance.

Despite their experiences in some of the most rigorous and demanding physical maneuvers on earth, even the most seasoned astronauts may be affected by SMS, resulting in symptoms of severe nausea, projectile vomiting, fatigue, malaise (feeling sick), and headache. These symptoms may occur so abruptly and without any warning that space travelers may vomit suddenly without time to contain the emesis, resulting in strong odors and liquid within the cabin which may affect other astronauts. Some changes to eye movement behaviors might also occur as a result of SMS. Symptoms typically last anywhere from one to three days upon entering weightlessness, but may recur upon reentry to Earth's gravity or even shortly after landing. SMS differs from terrestrial motion sickness in that sweating and pallor are typically minimal or absent and gastrointestinal findings usually demonstrate absent bowel sounds indicating reduced gastrointestinal motility.

Even when the nausea and vomiting resolve, some central nervous system symptoms may persist which may degrade the astronaut's performance. Graybiel and Knepton proposed the term "sopite syndrome" to describe symptoms of lethargy and drowsiness associated with motion sickness in 1976. Since then, their definition has been revised to include "...a symptom complex that develops as a result of exposure to real or apparent motion and is characterized by excessive drowsiness, lassitude, lethargy, mild depression, and reduced ability to focus on an assigned task." Together, these symptoms may pose a substantial threat (albeit temporary) to the astronaut who must remain attentive to life and death issues at all times.

SMS is most commonly thought to be a disorder of the vestibular system that occurs when sensory information from the visual system (sight) and the proprioceptive system (posture, position of the body) conflicts with misperceived information from the semicircular canals and the otoliths within the inner ear. This is known as the 'neural mismatch theory' and was first suggested in 1975 by Reason and Brand. Alternatively, the fluid shift hypothesis suggests that weightlessness reduces the hydrostatic pressure on the lower body causing fluids to shift toward the head from the rest of the body. These fluid shifts are thought to increase cerebrospinal fluid pressure (causing back aches), intracranial pressure (causing headaches), and inner ear fluid pressure (causing vestibular dysfunction).

Despite a multitude of studies searching for a solution to the problem of SMS, it remains an ongoing problem for space travel. Most non-pharmacological countermeasures such as training and other physical maneuvers have offered minimal benefit. Thornton and Bonato noted, "Pre- and inflight adaptive efforts, some of them mandatory and most of them onerous, have been, for the most part, operational failures." To date, the most common intervention is promethazine, an injectable antihistamine with antiemetic properties, but sedation can be a problematic side effect. Other common pharmacological options include metoclopramide, as well as oral and transdermal application of scopolamine, but drowsiness and sedation are common side effects for these medications as well.

Musculoskeletal effects
In the space (or microgravity) environment the effects of unloading varies significantly among individuals, with sex differences compounding the variability. Differences in mission duration, and the small sample size of astronauts participating in the same mission also adds to the variability to the musculoskeletal disorders that are seen in space. In addition to muscle loss, microgravity leads to increased bone resorption, decreased bone mineral density, and increased fracture risks. Bone resorption leads to increased urinary levels of calcium, which can subsequently lead to an increased risk of nephrolithiasis.

In the first two weeks that the muscles are unloaded from carrying the weight of the human frame during space flight, whole muscle atrophy begins. Postural muscles contain more slow fibers, and are more prone to atrophy than non-postural muscle groups. The loss of muscle mass occurs because of imbalances in protein synthesis and breakdown. The loss of muscle mass is also accompanied by a loss of muscle strength, which was observed after only 2–5 days of spaceflight during the Soyuz-3 and Soyuz-8 missions. Decreases in the generation of contractile forces and whole muscle power have also been found in response to microgravity.

To counter the effects of microgravity on the musculoskeletal system, aerobic exercise is recommended. This often takes the form of in-flight cycling. A more effective regimen includes resistive exercises or the use of a penguin suit (contains sewn-in elastic bands to maintain a stretch load on antigravity muscles), centrifugation, and vibration. Centrifugation recreates Earth's gravitational force on the space station, in order to prevent muscle atrophy. Centrifugation can be performed with centrifuges or by cycling along the inner wall of the space station. Whole body vibration has been found to reduce bone resorption through mechanisms that are unclear. Vibration can be delivered using exercise devices that use vertical displacements juxtaposed to a fulcrum, or by using a plate that oscillates on a vertical axis. The use of beta-2 adrenergic agonists to increase muscle mass, and the use of essential amino acids in conjunction with resistive exercises have been proposed as pharmacologic means of combating muscle atrophy in space.

Cardiovascular effects 

Next to the skeletal and muscular system, the cardiovascular system is less strained in weightlessness than on Earth and is de-conditioned during longer periods spent in space. In a regular environment, gravity exerts a downward force, setting up a vertical hydrostatic gradient. When standing, some 'excess' fluid resides in vessels and tissues of the legs. In a micro-g environment, with the loss of a hydrostatic gradient, some fluid quickly redistributes toward the chest and upper body; sensed as 'overload' of circulating blood volume. In the micro-g environment, the newly sensed excess blood volume is adjusted by expelling excess fluid into tissues and cells (12-15% volume reduction) and red blood cells are adjusted downward to maintain a normal concentration (relative anemia). In the absence of gravity, venous blood will rush to the right atrium because the force of gravity is no longer pulling the blood down into the vessels of the legs and abdomen, resulting in increased stroke volume. These fluid shifts become more dangerous upon returning to a regular gravity environment as the body will attempt to adapt to the reintroduction of gravity. The reintroduction of gravity again will pull the fluid downward, but now there would be a deficit in both circulating fluid and red blood cells. The decrease in cardiac filling pressure and stroke volume during the orthostatic stress due to a decreased blood volume is what causes orthostatic intolerance. Orthostatic intolerance can result in temporary loss of consciousness and posture, due to the lack of pressure and stroke volume. Some animal species have evolved physiological and anatomical features (such as high hydrostatic blood pressure and closer heart place to head) which enable them to counteract orthostatic blood pressure. More chronic orthostatic intolerance can result in additional symptoms such as nausea, sleep problems, and other vasomotor symptoms as well.

Many studies on the physiological effects of weightlessness on the cardiovascular system are done in parabolic flights. It is one of the only feasible options to combine with human experiments, making parabolic flights the only way to investigate the true effects of the micro-g environment on a body without traveling into space. Parabolic flight studies have provided a broad range of results regarding changes in the cardiovascular system in a micro-g environment. Parabolic flight studies have increased the understanding of orthostatic intolerance and decreased peripheral blood flow suffered by Astronauts returning to Earth. Due to the loss of blood to pump, the heart can atrophy in a micro-g environment. A weakened heart can result in low blood volume, low blood pressure and affect the body's ability to send oxygen to the brain without the individual becoming dizzy. Heart rhythm disturbances have also been seen among astronauts, but it is not clear whether this was due to pre-existing conditions of effects of a micro-g environment. One current countermeasure includes drinking a salt solution, which increases the viscosity of blood and would subsequently increase blood pressure which would mitigate post micro-g environment orthostatic intolerance. Another countermeasure includes administration of midodrine, which is a selective alpha-1 adrenergic agonist. Midodrine produces arterial and venous constriction resulting in an increase in blood pressure by baroreceptor reflexes.

See also 
 Astronaut training
 Astronauts
 Commercial astronauts
 Commercial use of space
 ESA Scientific Research on the International Space Station
 European Low Gravity Research Association
 G-jitter
 Reduced-gravity aircraft
 Scientific research on the International Space Station
 Space manufacturing
 Space medicine
 Weightlessness

References

External links 

 Overview of microgravity applications and methods
 Criticism of the terms "Zero Gravity" and "Microgravity", a persuasion to use terminology that reflects accurate physics (sci.space post).
 Microgravity Collection, The University of Alabama in Huntsville Archives and Special Collections
 Space Biology Research at AU-KBC Research Centre
 
 

Gravity
Weightlessness
Occupational safety and health